Shae Sloane (born ) is a retired professional Australian rules footballer, playing for the Melbourne Football Club in the AFL Women's competition. At club level, she played for University Blues in 2015. Her brother Rory Sloane is currently co-captain of the Adelaide Football Club. She has another, older brother, Dylan.

Sloane's interest in volleyball started when she first tried it in year 7 at Upwey High School. She travelled to South America with the team to compete in the World Grand Prix. In April 2021, Sloane announced her retirement.

References

1992 births
Living people
Australian women's volleyball players
Place of birth missing (living people)
Setters (volleyball)